The Japanese football champions are the winners of the top league in Japan, the Japan Soccer League from 1965 to 1992 and the J1 League since then.

Sanfrecce Hiroshima and Tokyo Verdy are the only teams that have won the title four times in a row (in 1965–1968 as Toyo Industries and in 1991–1994 as Yomiuri S.C./Verdy Kawasaki respectively). Notice that from 1985 to 1992 Japanese football adjusted to the "fall-spring" season schedule (common in most of Europe) but after establishment of J.League switched back to "spring-fall" scheme (common in North America, East Asia, and Nordic European latitudes).

Teams in bold have completed the double of the title and the Emperor's Cup in the same season. In 1985 no double was possible due to the season's timeframe change; thus, the doubles completed between then and 1992 are won in the middle of the season.

Japan Soccer League (1965–1971)
Numbers in parentheses indicate number of wins at the date. Leading goalscorer's nationality is at the time of award and does not necessarily indicate the national team played for.

Japan Soccer League Division 1 (1972–1992)

† Treble with the JSL Cup

J.League (1993–1998)
In 1992, professional J.League was established. All teams elected to it stripped themselves of corporate identities and adopted their own names. From 1993 to 2005 (except for 1996 season), and in 2015 and 2016, the league was contested in an Apertura and Clausura manner, thus the "runners-up" for these seasons are actually the winners of one of these tournaments which lost to the winners of the playoff. The "third places" are the highest-scoring teams in the aggregate table which were not involved in the playoff. If there was no playoff due to the champions winning both stages, the third place is the second-best points earning team who are not the champions.

J.League Division 1 (1999–2014)
Top flight becomes J.League Division 1 in 1999.

† Treble with the J.League Cup

J1 League (2015–present)
The league was renamed to J1 League in 2015.

Total titles won

Thirteen clubs have been champions, though only ten have won the title since the establishment of J. League. Of these ten, Kashima Antlers, Gamba Osaka, Nagoya Grampus and Kawasaki Frontale have never been Japan Soccer League champions.

All Japanese champion clubs still exist and are competing in the J. League; however, some may have moved from their Japan Soccer League locations they won the title at, or may have cut off ties with their original parent company.

Years in italic indicate Japan Soccer League seasons. Clubs in bold compete in J1 as of the 2023 season; clubs in italic no longer exist.

Wins by region
This is a breakdown by Japanese region, as clubs have moved cities before and even during the J.League period. Sanfrecce Hiroshima, Júbilo Iwata, Yokohama F. Marinos, Cerezo Osaka, Nagoya Grampus and Kawasaki Frontale are the only champion clubs who have always been based in their respective cities.

Note that JFA divides Japan into nine regions rather than the more traditional eight, splitting Chūbu into Hokushin'etsu and Tōkai. See Japanese Regional Leagues for further detail.

See also
J1 League
Japan Soccer League
Japanese Super Cup
List of winners of J2 League and predecessors
List of winners of J3 League and predecessors
Football in Japan
Japanese football league system
L. League (women's title)

Sources
List at RSSSF

J.League
winners clubs
Japan
champions
Winners